Soltan-Ali Vazir-e Afkham(13 December 1862 – 13 July 1914), was an Iranian politician who served as Prime Minister and Interior minister of Iran from 21 March 1907 to 30 April 1907.

References 

1862 births
1914 deaths
Prime Ministers of Iran
Government ministers of Iran
People of the Persian Constitutional Revolution
19th-century Iranian politicians
20th-century Iranian politicians
Politicians from Tehran
Interior Ministers of Iran